Gerli is an Estonian feminine given name and may refer to:
Gerli Israel (born 1995), footballer
Gerli Liinamäe (born 1995), figure skater
Gerli Padar (born 1979), singer

See also
Gerli, town in Argentina

References

Estonian feminine given names